Xinqiao is a town under the administration of Gaoyao City in western Guangdong province, China, located  south-southwest of downtown Zhaoqing. , it has one residential community and 12 villages under its administration.

See also 
 List of township-level divisions of Guangdong

References 

Gaoyao
Towns in Guangdong